In algebra, the Milnor–Moore theorem, introduced by   classifies an important class of Hopf algebras, of the sort that often show up as cohomology rings in algebraic topology.

from the universal enveloping algebra of the graded Lie algebra  of primitive elements of A to A is an isomorphism. The universal enveloping algebra of a graded Lie algebra L is the quotient of the tensor algebra of L by the two-sided ideal generated by all elements of the form .

In algebraic topology, the term usually refers to the corollary of the aforementioned result, that for a pointed, simply connected space X, the following isomorphism holds:
 

where  denotes the loop space of X, 

References

External links 

Theorems about algebras
Hopf algebras